Oirata nivella is a moth of the family Pterophoridae.

References

External links

Moths described in 2001
Pterophorini